Shawn C. Dooley is an American politician from the Commonwealth of Massachusetts. He was a member of the Massachusetts House of Representatives in the 9th Norfolk district, succeeding Dan Winslow. The 9th Norfolk District constitutes all or parts of the Towns of Medfield, Millis, Norfolk, Plainville, Walpole, and Wrentham. A member of the Republican Party, he was sworn in January 29, 2014. In 2022, he vacated the seat to run for the Massachusetts State Senate, he was defeated by incumbent Becca Rausch.

Personal life
Dooley received his bachelor's degree from Auburn University, and a master's degree from Anna Maria College. He is married to Family Law Attorney Carolyn (CiCi) Van Tine and they have four children.

Political career
Previously he served as the elected Norfolk Town Clerk as well as the Chairman of the Norfolk School Committee.

Dooley made national headlines for his bill on preventing Chinese owned and other non-market economy nations from participating in the state bid process for critical infrastructure such as rail. The impetus of this bill was when China's government owned CRRC gained the Massachusetts Bay Transit Authority contract for manufacturing orange lines cars. His original opinion piece sparked national coverage including Bloomberg, NPR, Washington Post and NBC radio. Similar bills were filed in both the U.S. House and Senate and passed in a bipartisan fashion.

In August 2020, the conservative website New Boston Post published an excerpt from Representative Dooley’s nightly Facebook post on the pandemic criticizing Massachusetts Governor Charlie Baker and calling him "King Charles" for implementing COVID-19 restrictions without consulting the legislature and issuing numerous executive orders under the guise of a state of emergency, after a spike of cases rose in Massachusetts.

On January 3, 2021, Dooley challenged Trump supporter Jim Lyons for the Chairmanship of the Massachusetts Republican Party in an effort to "capture that middle ground as opposed to going far hard-right". Dooley lost to Lyons with a vote of the Republican State Committee 39-36.

In 2022, Dooley ran for the Massachusetts State Senate.  He was defeated by incumbent Democrat Becca Rausch, 55-45.

Post State House Career 
Rep. Dooley resigned from his seat on December 27, 2022 at 5:00pm, a week before his term was set to expire. Following the resignation, outgoing Governor Charlie Baker appointed Dooley to the Massachusetts Civil Service Commission.

See also
 2019–2020 Massachusetts legislature
 2021–2022 Massachusetts legislature

References

External links

Living people
Massachusetts Republicans
People from Norfolk, Massachusetts
Auburn University alumni
Anna Maria College alumni
Year of birth missing (living people)
Place of birth missing (living people)
Massachusetts local politicians
City and town clerks
21st-century American politicians